Year 958 (CMLVIII) was a common year starting on Friday (link will display the full calendar) of the Julian calendar.

Events 
 By place 

 Byzantine Empire 
 October / November – Battle of Raban: The Byzantines under John Tzimiskes defeat the Hamdanid forces in northern Syria. Emir Sayf al-Dawla is forced to retreat – many of his court companions and ghilman fall in pursuit, while over 1,700 of his Turk cavalry are captured and paraded in the streets of Constantinople.

 Europe 
 King Berengar II invades the March of Verona, which is under control of the dukes of Bavaria, and lay siege to Count Adalbert Atto at Canossa Castle (northern Italy). Berengar sends a Lombard expeditionary force under his son Guy of Ivrea against Theobald II, duke of Spoleto. He captures Spoleto and Camerino.

 Africa 
 The Fatimid general Abu al-Hasan Jawhar ibn Abd Allah takes Ifgan, the capital of the rebellious Kharijite Banu Ya'la tribe. In the following two years, Jawhar conquers most of the north of modern-day Morocco and Algeria. In particular, he conquers the cities of Tangier, Sijilmasa and Tlemcen.

 Asia 
 King Ksemagupta dies of a fever after a hunting party. He is succeeded by his youngest son Abhimanyu II. Queen Didda, the widow of Ksemagupta, becomes regent and the de facto ruler of Kashmir (modern India).
 Emperor Chai Rong of the Later Zhou invades the Northern Han and the Khitan Empire in the Sixteen Prefectures (northern China), but is defeated.

Births 
 Basil II (Bulgar Slayer), Byzantine emperor (d. 1025)
 Otto-William, count of Burgundy (approximate date)
 Rinchen Zangpo, Tibetan Buddhist monk (d. 1055)
 Samuel, tsar of the Bulgarian Empire (approximate date)
 Vladimir I (the Great), Grand Prince of Kiev (d. 1015)
 Yang Yanzhao, general of the Song Dynasty (d. 1014)
 Yaropolk I, Grand Prince of Kiev (approximate date)

Deaths 
 May – Ibn Durustawayh, Persian grammarian, lexicographer and student of the Quran and hadith (b. 872)
 June 2 – Oda (the Good), archbishop of Canterbury
 September 17 – Li Jingsui, Chinese prince (b. 920)
 September 18 – Liu Sheng, Chinese emperor (b. 920)
 October 15 – Toda, queen of Pamplona (b. 876)
date unknown
Ammar ibn Ali al-Kalbi, Fatimid military commander
Faifne an Filí, Irish poet and ollamh ("professor")
Finshneachta Ua Cuill, Irish poet
Fujiwara no Kiyotada, Japanese poet
Lashkarwarz, Daylamite military commander
Mastalus II, duke and patrician of Amalfi (Italy)
Ōnakatomi no Yorimoto, Japanese waka poet
Qingliang Wenyi, Chinese Buddhist monk
Sumbat I, king of Iberia (Georgia)
probable 
Drogo, duke of Brittany
Gorm the Old, king of Denmark. He was born before 900 and may have died as late as 964.

References